Kempt Shore  is a small community in the Canadian province of Nova Scotia, located in The Municipality of the District of West Hants in Hants County, named after General Sir James Kempt, who served as Lieutenant-Governor of Nova Scotia from 1820 - 28.
 Situated at the mouth of the Avon river and overlooking Minas Basin, it is home to the annual Acoustic Maritime Music Festival.

History
Kempt Shore is named after General Sir James Kempt, who served as Lieutenant-Governor of Nova Scotia from 1820 - 28. There had been a few Acadian families living in this area prior to the Expulsion in 1755. British settlers arrived to take over the lands in the early 19th Century. Kempt Shore Ocean View Campground is the site of the Acoustic Maritime Music Festival, held the third full weekend of July.

References

Kempt Shore on Destination Nova Scotia

Communities in Hants County, Nova Scotia
General Service Areas in Nova Scotia